Malaysia competed at the 2013 World Aquatics Championships in Barcelona, Spain between 19 July and 4 August 2013.

Medalists

Diving

Malaysia qualified 8 divers for the following events.

Men

Women

Open water swimming

Malaysia qualified one quota place for the following event in open water swimming.

Swimming

Malaysian swimmers earned qualifying standards in the following events (up to a maximum of 2 swimmers in each event at the A-standard entry time, and 1 at the B-standard):

Men

Women

References

External links
Amateur Swimming Union of Malaysia
Barcelona 2013 Official Site

Nations at the 2013 World Aquatics Championships
2013 in Malaysian sport
Malaysia at the World Aquatics Championships